John Sell Cotman (16 May 1782 – 24 July 1842) was an English marine and landscape painter, etcher, illustrator, and a leading member of the Norwich School of painters.

Born in Norwich, the son of a silk merchant and lace dealer, Cotman was educated at the Norwich Grammar School. He showed an early talent for art. It was intended that he followed his father into the family business but, intent on a career in art, he moved to London in 1798, where he met artists such as J. M. W. Turner, Peter de Wint and Thomas Girtin, whose sketching club he joined, and whom he travelled with to Wales and Surrey. By 1800 he was exhibiting at the Royal Academy, showing scenes of the Welsh countryside there in 1801 and 1802. His drawing expeditions took him throughout southern Britain, and to Yorkshire, where he stayed with the Cholmeley family during the three summers of 1803–1805.

His sons Miles Edmund and John Joseph Cotman became notable painters in their own right.

Life

Early years

John Sell Cotman was born in Norwich, on 16 May 1782, the first child of Edmund Cotman, hairdresser and his wife Ann (nee Sell) living at 26 Bridge Street, in St George's parish. Edmund Cotman later became a silk merchant and a lace dealer. Their son was baptised at St. Mary Coslany, Norwich, on 7 June 1782. The family name was written as Cottman in the parish baptism record, which has survived.

Cotman was educated at Norwich Grammar School, and is recorded as starting there as a non-paying pupil on 3 August 1793. He showed a talent for art from an early age and would often go out on drawing trips into the countryside around Norwich and the North Norfolk coast. A story survives that the boy's headmaster, Dr Forster, disliked cats. When Forster saw a large realistic-looking cardboard cat on his desk, he held the silhouette up and said, "I know who is the only boy who could have drawn this." Smiling, he put the cat away.

His father intended him to go into the family business, but the boy was instead intent on a career in art. When asked for his advice, the artist John Opie replied to Cotman's father: "let him rather black boots than follow the profession of an artist". A drawing from this period, House at St Stephen's Road, Norwich (1794), is considered to be the earliest surviving work by Cotman, produced when he was a boy of 12.

Move to London 

Cotman moved to London, probably in 1798. He lived at 28 Gerrard Street, Soho, initially making a living through commissions from print-sellers. His sketches at Rudulph Ackerman's print shop at 96 The Strand were studied by the Norwich artist John Thirtle when a young man. Cotman came under the patronage of Thomas Munro, physician to the Bridewell and Bethlehem Hospitals, whose house in Adelphi Terrace was a studio and a meeting place for artists, that had included the young J. M. W. Turner and Thomas Girtin. Cotman was influenced by Girtin, and soon joined his sketching club. During the summer of 1799 the two artists went together to Surrey on a drawing expedition. In 1800 (and again in 1802 with his landlord, the artist Paul Sandby Munn), Cotman travelled to Wales to sketch. 

In 1800, Cotman exhibited at the Royal Academy for the first time. He exhibited other Welsh scenes at the Royal Academy in 1801 and 1802. In 1800, he was awarded an honorary palette by the Society of Arts. He continued to exhibit at the Academy until 1806. He was based during the early 1800s in London, but is known to have advertised in Norwich—in September 1802 he advertised his services as a drawing teacher in the Norwich Mercury.

Yorkshire visits (1803–1805)
In the three summers of 18031805, Cotman stayed with the Cholmeley family at Brandsby Hall in Yorkshire. On the last of these three visits from London, he made a series of watercolours of the River Greta, after he was invited to visit Rokeby Park, the home of the English traveller John Morritt. Cotman's delicate paintings from these visits are among the finest produced by a European watercolourist.

Return to Norwich

In late 1806, Cotman returned to live in Norwich. He joined the recently-formed Norwich Society of Artists, exhibiting 149 works with the society between 1807 and 1810. He became President of the Society in 1811.

Cotman married Ann Miles at Felbrigg parish church on 6 January 1809. The pair remained devoted throughout their married lives. Their eldest child Miles Edmund was born on 5 February the year after their marriage. Their daughter Ann was born in July 1812 after the family moved to Great Yarmouth in April 1812, followed by three more sons, John Joseph Cotman, (Francis) Walter, and Alfred Henry. who were born in 1814, 1816 and 1819 respectively. A sixth child, a daughter, was born in 1822.

As part of his teaching, Cotman operated his own version of a watercolour subscription library, so that his pupils could take home his drawings to copy. In 1810, Cotman began to etch, and the following year his first set of etchings (Miscellaneous Etchings) was published, strongly influenced by the work of the Italian artist Piranesi. All but one of the subjects were architectural, and were mostly of Yorkshire buildings. He later published a set of etchings of the ancient buildings of Norfolk (Architectural Antiquities of Norfolk (1818).

In 1817, 1818, and 1820, Cotman visited Normandy with his friend the banker Dawson Turner, and made drawings of buildings. Two years later he published a set of 100 etchings based on sketches made during his Normandy tour. After these visits, the character of his paintings changed, the later ones being more brightly coloured.

Move to Great Yarmouth and return to Norwich
From 1812 to 1823, Cotman lived on the Norfolk coast at Great Yarmouth, where he studied the shipping, and mastered depicting the form of sea waves. Some of his finest marine pieces date from this time. 

Cotman returned to Norwich in 1824, hoping to improve his financial position, and moved into a large house in St Martin's Plain, opposite the Bishop's Palace, where he built up a collection of prints, books, armour, and models of ships, to aid his compositions. He showed work from 1823 to 1825 at the Norwich Society of Artists' annual exhibitions.

In 1825, Cotman became an Associate of the Royal Society of Painters in Watercolours and was a frequent exhibitor there until 1839. However he was driven to despair by his constant financial struggles.

King's College, London
In January 1834, Cotman was appointed Master of landscape drawing at King's College School in London, partly on the recommendation of J. M. W. Turner. In 1836, his son Miles Edmund was appointed to assist him. The poet and artist Dante Gabriel Rossetti was one of his pupils. In London, Cotman developed friendships with the artists James Stark, George Cattermole, Samuel Prout, and Cornelius Varley. In 1836, he became an honorary member of the Institute of British Architects. In 1838, all of his etchings were published by Henry George Bohn.

In 1834, Miles Edmund remained in Norwich to work as an art teacher, when the rest of the Cotman family moved to London upon Cotman's appointment at King's College. A year after his move to London, Mile Edmund moved to London to be his father's assistant, after his brother John Joseph returned to Norwich. Miles Edmund succeeded his father as drawing master at King's College in 1843.

Final years

From 1839, Cotman became severely depressed, a condition that lasted into 1841. That year, he resumed his correspondence with Dawson Turner. Granted a fortnight's leave from King's College, he journeyed from London to Great Yarmouth by ship and then on to Norwich, ultimately staying in Norfolk for two months before returning to the capital. He produced some chalk drawings of church interiors, and of the Norfolk countryside, the dates of which allow his journey around the county to be traced: his sketches included Itteringham, 12 November and Storm off Cromer. During this period he was able to visit his elderly father at Thorpe St Andrew, when he probably began preparatory work for a painting, entitled From my Father's House at Thorpe. His last oil painting—dated 18 January 1842 and never completed—was A View of the Norwich River.

Cotman's depression returned, and by June 1842 he had become seriously ill, dying "of natural decay" on 24 July 1842. He was interred in the cemetery of St John's Wood Chapel, London. In his will he left everything to his wife Ann, and enabled her to receive a pension. His paintings and drawings were sold off from May 1843, fetching lower and lower prices for his financially-troubled family as the sales continued.

Paintings, drawings, and etchings

Over 600 of Cotman's watercolours and drawings were bought by the Norwich curator James Reeve, who sold more than half of them to the British Museum in 1902; the remainder of Reeve's collection was acquired by the Norwich Castle from the collection of the Norfolk industrialist Russell Colman. Some of Cotman's paintings, etchings, and drawings are on public display in Norwich, where well over 2,000 works are held. Other works are at the Leeds Art Gallery, the Tate Gallery, the British Museum and the Victoria and Albert Museum, the Fitzwilliam Museum in Cambridge, and other regional centres. In the United States, there are works by Cotman at the Yale Center for British Art in New Haven, Connecticut, and in other galleries around the country.

Cotman was not thought to be important during his lifetime, and he made little money from sales of his paintings and drawings. The sale of his works and library took place over five days at Christie's. His drawings and pictures fetched £260, his collection of books and art was sold off for £300 and the sum total for his prints was £30.

Cotman's architectural etchings have long been considered as a valuable record for historians.

Reputation and legacy
Cotman and Crome were the two finest of the Norwich School of painters, who were both recognised by the public during their lives, with Cotman's Architectural Antiquities of Normandy bringing him wider praise. The art historian Andrew Moore, describes the artists as "two of the most original talents in the history of early nineteenth century British art", and thet they were rivalled only by Turner, Girtin, and the English artist John Constable. The 1887 edition of the Dictionary of National Biography noted that Cotman's reputation had improved over time, and described him as "one of the most original and versatile of English artists of the first half of this century, a draughtsman and colourist of exceptional gifts, a water-colourist worthy to be ranked among the greater men, and excellent whether as a painter of land or sea".

The Norwich Art Circle exhibited 100 of Cotman's works at Norwich in 1888, the first time his collected works had been shown in public. The exhibition led to a critical appraisal of his output and secured a second exhibition that year at the Burlington Fine Arts Club.

The art historians Lawrence Binyon and William Dickes both wrote extensively about Cotman's oil paintings and watercolours. His oils were first exhibited when they were shown at the Tate Gallery, London in 1922  According to his biographer Sydney Kitson, Cotman's reputation was enhanced by The Water-Colour Drawings of John Sell Cotman by Paul Oppé, which appeared in a special edition of The Studio in 1923.

Cotman's reputation has been hidden by misinformation, and by works that were in the past misattributed. Among his pupils, the most notable were Thirtle and Cotman's own sons.

Gallery

Watercolours

Oils, drawings, and etchings

Notes

References

Bibliography

Further reading

External links

 2012: Cotman in Normandy from Dulwich Picture Gallery, which includes a lecture about the artist by Timothy Wilcox, the curator of the gallery's 2012 Cotman exhibition

Artistic output
 
 Works by Cotman in the Norfolk Museums Collections
 The Cotman Collection at Leeds Art Gallery
 Works by Cotman at the British Museum.
 Works by Cotman and plates from Cotman's Liber Studiorum (1838) at the Cleveland Museum of Art.
 Works by (or associated with) John Sell Cotman held by the National Trust
 Works by John Sell Cotman at the Metropolitan Museum of Art, New York
 In Fisher's Drawing Room Scrap Book, 1834, as illustration to Letitia Elizabeth Landon's poem :
 Perawa, Malwa, engraved by W LePetit.

Published works
 1838: Liber Studiorum (produced between 1805 and 1814)
 1818: Etchings of Ancient Buildings in England
 1817: Specimens of Norman and Gothic Architecture in the County of Norfolk 
 1818: Excursions in the County of Norfolk, volumes 1 and 2
 1819: Sepulchral brasses in Norfolk and Suffolk, volumes 1 (Norfolk) and 2 (Suffolk) 
 1822: Architectural Antiquities of Normandy, by John Sell Cotman; accompanied by historical and descriptive notices by Dawson Turner, Esq. F.R. and A.S 

18th-century English painters
English male painters
19th-century English painters
English watercolourists
Landscape artists
English illustrators
English etchers
British marine artists
English printmakers
Artists from Norwich
People educated at Norwich School
1782 births
1842 deaths
19th-century English male artists
18th-century English male artists